Kensington/115th Street is a commuter rail station on the far south side of Chicago that serves the Metra Electric Line north to Millennium Station and south to University Park and Blue Island. The station is located at 115th Street and Cottage Grove Avenue in the Pullman & West Pullman, Chicago neighborhoods. It is the last station for Blue Island Branch trains before those split off of the main line for Blue Island. , the station is the 37th busiest of Metra's 236 non-downtown stations, with an average of 1,136 weekday boardings. The South Shore Line diverges to Indiana immediately south of this station. It had previously stopped at this station prior to February 15, 2012, with the reconfiguration of the junction to minimize congestion.

In 1991, an advocacy group formed to press Metra to make necessary cosmetic and safety upgrades to this station, one of the busiest on the Metra Electric line. Dubbed "Operation Restore Kensington," the group pressured railroad officials to work closely with the city to upgrade parking, enhance station lighting, landscaping and security, and persuade local vendors to open concession stands in the station. For its efforts, O.R.K. monitored the railroad's efforts to build a brand new station and assisted with the railroad's efforts to increase station parking facilities. O.R.K. was disbanded in the 1990s.

The station was also served by Illinois Central intercity-trains from Chicago to points south.

A station typology adopted by the Chicago Plan Commission on October 16, 2014, assigns the Kensington/115th Street station a typology of Local Activity Center. A Local Activity Center typology is primarily characterized by the Metra station being the central focus of a built-up and identifiable neighborhood.

Bus connections
CTA
  4 Cottage Grove 
  111A Pullman Shuttle 
  115 Pullman/115th 

Improvements:
 Newly paved parking area as of 2020.
 Improvement projects near Cottage Grove Avenue which is connected to the Pullman neighborhood improvements.

See also
 Kensington, Chicago

References

External links 

115th Street entrance from Google Maps Street View

Former Illinois Central Railroad stations
Metra stations in Chicago
Former South Shore Line stations
Former New York Central Railroad stations
Former Michigan Central Railroad stations
Railway stations in the United States opened in 1916

